Tris(2,3-dibromopropyl) phosphate ("tris") is a chemical once widely used as a flame retardant in plastics and textiles.

Safety and regulation
Tris is mutagenic and listed as an IARC Group 2A carcinogen.  It is one of the chemicals covered by the Rotterdam Convention.  In the United States, the Consumer Product Safety Commission banned the sale of children's garments containing tris in 1977. Arlene Blum was one of those involved in getting tris banned.

See also
 Tris(1,3-dichloro-2-propyl)phosphate
 Tris(2-chloroethyl) phosphate

References

Organophosphates
Organobromides
Flame retardants
IARC Group 2A carcinogens